The Kinner House is a historic house in Holdrege, Nebraska. It was built in 1903 for the Tibbals family, including Francis M. Kinner who was married to one of the Kibbals' daughters, and was designed in the Classical Revival style, with "ionic columns, decorative door surround and the symmetrical facade." It has been listed on the National Register of Historic Places since April 14, 2004.

References

.

National Register of Historic Places in Phelps County, Nebraska
Neoclassical architecture in Nebraska
Houses completed in 1903
1903 establishments in Nebraska

Kinner and Company Ltd.